The heavyweight class in the boxing at the 1964 Summer Olympics competition was the heaviest class.  Heavyweights included all boxers weighing in at more than 81 kilograms. 14 boxers from 14 nations competed.

Medalists

Results

References

Sources

H